Time Slip is a platform action video game developed by Sales Curve Interactive and published by Vic Tokai, featuring the adventures of Dr. Vincent Gilgamesh, a scientist attempting to foil an alien invasion to Earth by traveling to different historic ages. This game was only released to the Super Nintendo Entertainment System.

Storyline
The game takes place in 2145, when the Tirmatians, intelligent alien beings from planet Tirmat, discover a sort of space-time portal -or "rift", as it is called in the game- that interconnects their homeworld with Earth. Meanwhile, human astronomers discover the same rift, but are not aware of the existence of Tirmat. They also discover that the rift is growing in a geometric rate. As they try to study it, the Tirmatians launch an exploratory probe, named "Torquemada II", in order to find a planet similar to Tirmat; the probe soon finds Earth and sends information back to Tirmat.

As Earth astronomers continue studying the space-time rift in 2147, the Tirmat leadership agrees to send explorers to Earth. It turns out that Tirmatians are planning to conquest Earth to convert it into "Tirmat II." However, Tirmatians have learned that humans have highly developed fighting skills and a vast amount of weapons, and they obviously would not agree to be enslaved. Because the power of the human defense forces, they decide to change their strategy, abandoning a conventional, frontal attack on Earth forces (because they would likely face a high casualty rate and even a defeat) in favor of a plan focusing on a time-traveling technology. This plan consists in sending Tirmatian expeditionary forces to several historic ages, in order to interfere with the development of human weaponry. By doing this, they can secure a victory by truncating the evolution of human weapons, leaving humankind with nothing but weak weapons and at the mercy of Tirmatian forces in the future. But their carefully planned strategy has a flaw: it failed to take in count the human intellect.

As Tirmat expeditionary forces are dispatched, a group of scientists led by Dr. Vincent Gilgamesh unveils the prototype of a time-travelling machine. Suddenly, Tirmatians launch an attack on the laboratory where Dr. Gilgamesh works; all but Dr. Gilgamesh are killed. Without having time to test the time-traveling machine, he decides to travel back in time to stop Tirmat's conquest plans. A battle between Dr. Gilgamesh and Tirmatians starts, and it is only a matter of time to decide who shall win.

Gameplay
The gameplay is similar to that of Contra III: The Alien Wars, although with simpler moves and nine lives, but not continues (as opposed to most games of this genre). The game's mechanic also features a TGS bar, or "power bar", which must be filled with special time crystals before emptying; otherwise, the player will lose a life each time the bar empties. The TGS bar is a part of the time-traveling device, and must be filled frequently. The bar slowly empties itself and by being hurt by an enemy, so players must literally "run for their lives" and collect as many crystals they can. After scoring a given number of points, players are awarded extra lives.

Levels
Levels are long and full of enemies and traps; players may find themselves fending off many weak enemies before battling an oversized (albeit weak) sub-boss, only to face an even stronger, bigger level boss. Traps, in turn, are based on the technology available in each age. A common occurrence was to mistake a sub-boss for the level's boss, because both sub-bosses and level bosses always were oversized and strong.

Enemies
Regular enemies include humans from past ages and Tirmatians; they often appear together. The game also features animals and mythical beings. Sets of traps are scattered all over the game, but are quite simple. Bosses and sub-bosses often take the appearance of oversized mythological figures, always adjusting to the age they appear on.

Weapons
The player can use several weapons as laser guns, bombs, etc., which are collected as the game progresses. However, the player can lose its weapons after losing a life. It is also possible to use armored vehicles in some levels.

Lives
Unlike other games, there is no cheat code that extends the number of lives, nor can the player adjust the difficulty level or the number of lives to start with. The game also lacked of continues or a saving mode, forcing the player to restart the game from the first level after running out of lives. After running out of lives, the game ended and a screen appeared announcing Dr. Gilgamesh's fate by ominously declaring "Mission Failure You were never born.... Earth becomes Tirmat II...." (implying that the Tirmatian plan succeeded and that also intervened on Dr. Gilgamesh's life), as he fell into a whirlwind-like vortex.

Reception

References 

1993 video games
Platform games
Post-apocalyptic video games
Science fiction video games
Side-scrolling video games
Super Nintendo Entertainment System games
Super Nintendo Entertainment System-only games
Video games about time travel
Vic Tokai games
Video games developed in the United Kingdom